The Reform Party of the United States of America held primary elections for its presidential candidate in May 2012.

Candidates

Nominee
Andre Barnett of  New York

Other Candidates
Blake Ashley of Missouri
Dick McCormick of Washington
Darcy Richardson of Pennsylvania
Michael Whitley of Florida
 Alan Banuethuelos of Minnesota 3rd place

Dropped Out Candidates

Robby Wells of Georgia
Laurence Kotlikoff of Massachusetts

References

Reform Party of the United States of America presidential primaries
Reform